Margarella obsoleta is a species of sea snail, a marine gastropod mollusk in the family Calliostomatidae.

Distribution
This marine species occurs in subantarctic waters off South Georgia.

References

 Lamy, E. 1911. Sur quelques mollusques de la Géorgia du Sud et des îles Sandwich du Sud. Bulletin du Muséum National d'Histoire Naturelle 1911: 22-27

External links
 Powell, A. W. B. 1951. Antarctic and Subantarctic Mollusca: Pelecypoda and Gastropoda. Discovery Reports 26: 47-196, pls. 5-10
 To Encyclopedia of Life
 To World Register of Marine Species

obsoleta
Gastropods described in 1951